Indy Dontje (born 21 November 1992 in Alkmaar, North Holland) is a Dutch racing driver. After starting in ADAC Formel Masters and ATS Formel 3 Cup Dontje is now a Mercedes-Benz GT3 driver.

Career

Karting
Father Arthur Dontje supported his sons Indy and Milan with their own karting team early in their careers. Arthurs chocolate company, Dobla, was the naming sponsor. Indy started racing in Rotax Max powered classes, such as MiniMax and Junior Max. After graduating into shifter karts, Dontje raced in the German Karting Championship in 2009 against other young hopefuls such as Jack Hawksworth and Hannes van Asseldonk. Later in his karting career, in 2010 and 2011, the young karter competed in the USA in the SKUSA SuperNationals. In 2010 Dontje finished third in the S1 class. The following year Dontje finished second in a factory supported Energy Corse kart.

Single seaters
Dontje made his single-seater debut in 2012 at age 19. Racing in the ADAC Formel Masters Dontje joined Team Motopark, part of the Lotus F1 junior program. During the season Dontje scored one podium finish, a third place at the Sachsenring. For 2013 Dontje remained at Team Motopark. He won the third race of the season, at Motorsport Arena Oschersleben. The Dutchman won a second race at the Red Bull Ring. Dontje was the only driver to score points every single race during the season. This placed the Dutchman sixth in the series standings.

For 2014 Dontje remained at the Lotus backed Team Motopark to race in the ATS Formel 3 Cup. With the German F3 championship running older machinery compared to the European F3, the German championship struggled to attract many drivers with many races being run with less than ten drivers. Dontje scored fourteen podium finishes, with a single victory, out of 23 races. Dontje won the second race during the Red Bull Ring weekend. The Dutchman also competed in the 2014 Zandvoort Masters. Dontje challenged Nabil Jeffri for third but had to settle for fourth place, scoring the fastest racelap in the progress.

GT racing

In 2015 Rowe Racing named Dontje as one of their drivers for the 2015 Blancpain Endurance Series. After the opening three races, Dontje switched to the GT Russian Team for the 2015 24 Hours of Spa and remained at the team for the season final.

With Rowe Racing switching to BMW, Dontje remained in the AMG Customer Sports program with HTP Motorsport for 2016. Dontje ran the full 2016 Blancpain GT Series Endurance Cup with teammates Luciano Bacheta and Clemens Schmid. The teams best finish was a fifth place at Silverstone. He also made his debut in the 24 Hours of Nürburgring racing with fellow Mercedes-AMG team Black Falcon. The team retired after 57 laps. For 2017 Dontje switched from the Blancpain Endurance Series to the ADAC GT Masters. With the Mercedes-AMG GT Dontje scored two podium finishes, at Zandvoort and the Sachsenring, to place thirteenth in the series championship.

In 2023, Dontje joined Winward Racing in their expanded GT World Challenge Europe Endurance Cup effort, competing alongside Philip Ellis and Russell Ward in the Gold Cup class.

Results

Complete 24 Hours of Nürburgring results

Complete Blancpain GT Series Sprint Cup results

Complete Blancpain Endurance Series results

Complete ADAC GT Masters results

References

1992 births
Dutch racing drivers
Sportspeople from Alkmaar
British Formula Three Championship drivers
ADAC Formel Masters drivers
Blancpain Endurance Series drivers
ADAC GT Masters drivers
Living people
International GT Open drivers
24H Series drivers
WeatherTech SportsCar Championship drivers
24 Hours of Daytona drivers
German Formula Three Championship drivers
Motopark Academy drivers
Rowe Racing drivers
Mercedes-AMG Motorsport drivers
R-ace GP drivers
ART Grand Prix drivers
Phoenix Racing drivers
Nürburgring 24 Hours drivers
Michelin Pilot Challenge drivers